The Slovak Football Association (SFZ) is the governing body of football in Slovakia based in Bratislava. It has the ultimate responsibility for the control and development of football in Slovakia and is the body that runs the Slovakia national football teams.

It was founded on 4 November 1938 and originally became a member of FIFA in 1939, but disbanded after World War II because Czech and Slovak football competitions combined, and so did the national teams. Following the breakup of Czechoslovakia, the organisation was reformed, joining the European governing body, UEFA, in 1993 and rejoining FIFA in 1994.

National teams
The Slovak Football Association runs the Slovakia national football team, as well as male youth teams at under-21, under-19,  under-18, under-17, under-16 and under-15 level. In addition to this, it also organises the Slovakia women's national football team.

Slovakia have played in three major tournaments since the breakup of Czechoslovakia: the 2010 FIFA World Cup, UEFA Euro 2016 and UEFA Euro 2020, reaching round of sixteen in both the World Cup 2010 and Euro 2016, but did not advance out of the group stage at Euro 2020. Slovakia were also represented in the 2000 Summer Olympics football tournament, where they were eliminated in the group stage, following a semi-final appearance by their under-21 team in the 2000 UEFA European Under-21 Championship, which Slovakia hosted. They wouldn't feature at the Championships again until 2017.

References

External links
 Official site (in Slovak, Hungarian and English)
 Slovakia at FIFA site
 Slovakia at UEFA site

Slovakia
Football in Slovakia
Futsal in Slovakia
Football
Sports organizations established in 1938
1938 establishments in Slovakia